Bundesgericht may refer to
Federal Supreme Court of Switzerland
Bundesgericht (Germany), a kind of court in Germany